Warragul is a town in Victoria, Australia,  south-east of Melbourne. Warragul lies between the Strzelecki Ranges to the south and the Mount Baw Baw Plateau of the Great Dividing Range to the north.

Warragul is the main population and service centre of the West Gippsland region and the Shire of Baw Baw. The surrounding area is noted for dairy farming and other niche agriculture and has long been producing gourmet foods.

Naming

Warragul (or warrigal, worrigle, warragal) is a New South Wales Indigenous word from the Darug language meaning wild dog or dingo. The town name is accepted to mean wild dog and various businesses in the town use the words 'Wild Dog' in their name.

However, the word was recorded as being used by settlers of Gippsland in the 1840s and 1850s to mean wild Aboriginal or a Gunai/Kurnai person. The traditional land of the Gunai/Kurnai people includes the town of Warragul, then intersects with Kulin territory to the west of the town.

In a local history book, Graeme Butler wrote that the name of Warragul station was derived from an Indigenous word just meaning wild. British botanist Daniel Bunce recorded warrigal as belonging to a Kulin language and meaning wild, ferocious and enemy, but P D Gardner suggests Bunce was correct in translation, but incorrect in origin, since the word comes from Darug.

The word is also used for the naming of Warrigal Creek in South Gippsland to refer to the inhabitants of the area.

History
The town of Warragul began as a construction camp on McLeod's Track, now Brandy Creek Road, at the point where the surveyed railway line linked to the coach road. John Lardner surveyed the townships along the line in 1877 and noted that the early arrivals in the area were squatters, who had erected their shops and dwellings on Crown land. The squatters' blocks were not offered for the first sale of town land on 2 March 1878, but were available to purchase on the second sale later that month.

In November 1873, The Victorian Parliament passed an Act approving the construction of a railway linking Oakleigh to Sale. The construction of Gippsland railway line began simultaneously from both directions. The Warragul railway station opened on 1 March 1878 and the first train ran through in the same month. In May 1890 Warragul railway station became a junction station when a branch line was opened to Rokeby (later extended to Neerim South and Noojee).

The first Warragul post office opened on 16 March 1877 at the general store operated by James Biram, who became the first postmaster. A contract to build an official post office was made on 4 April 1887 and a foundation stone was laid on 4 June 1887. The building was completed and occupied the following year. Warragul's modern post office was opened on 3 April 1967, after the old post office closed on 18 September 1965 and was demolished in 1966.

Existing roads were renamed Princes Highway after the visit to Australia in 1920 of the then Prince of Wales (the future King Edward VIII).  The highway was officially opened on 10 August 1920 at a ceremony in Warragul.

Warragul's Petersville Milk Products Factory in Queen Street supplied the famous Peters Ice Cream brand's factory in Mulgrave with all the dairy raw material (fresh cream and concentrated skim milk) for 35 years. The plant also manufactured skim milk powder under the famous Dutch Jug brand and butter under the Iceberg brand. It exported butter, butter oil and milk powders to Southeast Asia and the Middle East.

Warragul was voted Premier Town in Victoria, 1970–1973.

The Warragul Magistrates' Court closed on 1 January 1990.

Geography
Warragul is located on hills that extend north from the Strzelecki Ranges near Ellinbank, joining to the Baw Baws in the Neerim District. This range is historically referred to as the Warragul Hills. The range effectively separates the flatlands of the Koo-Wee-Rup swamp (starting near Longwarry) in the west and the Moe Swamp on the eastern side (starting near Darnum).

Warragul contains the Linear Park Arts Discovery Trail, a trail covering several adjacent parks in the town. It features painted bollards, mosaics and murals. The trail joins up with the Drouin to Warragul Two Towns Trail.

Events
Warragul is the major township closest to Lardner, the home of the Gippsland Field Days. Three major events are held at Lardner Park each year—the Farm World agricultural show, Trucks in Action, and Harvest of Gippsland. The Farm World agricultural show is a major drawcard for the Warragul area. Every year in late March, Warragul plays host to these Field Days at Lardner Park. The Field Days are Australia's premier mixed farming Field Days and they include one of Australia's most diverse ranges of beef cattle, dairying and horticulture exhibits. 

Warragul is also home to the annual Warragul Show, which is held on the first Friday of March each year. It is traditionally a farming and livestock show, but includes rides, stalls, games, fireworks and showbags. It is held at the Warragul showgrounds.

Education
For a town of its size, Warragul has a large education industry with four primary schools, three secondary schools and two tertiary institutions.

Primary schools
Both Warragul Primary (opened in 1879) and Warragul North Primary (opened c.1954) are state primary schools, St. Joseph's Catholic Primary Warragul and St. Angela's of the Cross are Catholic schools, and St. Paul's Anglican Grammar School is an Anglican Church of Australia (formerly Church of England) primary school.

Warragul & District Specialist School is a junior school that focuses on educating children aged 5 to 10 years of age. The school uses a series of teaching tools such as PECS (Picture Exchange Communication System) and AUSLAN.

Secondary schools
There are three secondary schools in Warragul, these include Warragul Regional College, Marist-Sion College and St Paul's Anglican Grammar School. Warragul Regional College was formed in 1994 from the merger of Warragul High School and Warragul Secondary College. Marist-Sion College was formed in 1975 as a result of the merger between the Marist Brothers Boys College and the Our Lady of Sion Girls College. St. Paul's Anglican Grammar School was formed in 1982 with just nineteen year 7 students and has grown quite significantly in recent years.

Tertiary institutions
The Central Gippsland Institute of TAFE has a campus located to the south of the CBD adjacent to the railway station. The Education Centre Gippsland has recently taken over the courses previously provided by the McMillan Institute of Land and Food Resources, a former campus of the University of Melbourne. The courses offered encompass the areas of agriculture, equine management, harness racing, horticulture and conservation and land management.

Transport
Warragul railway station is a staffed V/Line station located to the south of the Warragul CBD.  The railway station is situated on the Gippsland railway line, which services the towns between Bairnsdale and Melbourne Southern Cross.

Warragul has a modest bus network consisting of four routes within the town's boundaries.  Each route has a frequency of three services a day.  There are also bus services to neighbouring towns.  The Warragul bus network was recently upgraded with the Myki technology, fitted to all town buses.  This ticketing system has been implemented on the V/Line Train services during 2014–15.

Sport
Warragul United Soccer Club was founded in 1963 and represent the town in Association Football, playing in the Victorian State League Division 1 South East.

The Warragul Warriors are the representative teams of the Warragul and District Amateur Basketball Association. They have a long history of success, most recently winning the Gippsland and State titles in the Country Basketball League.

The town has an Australian Rules football team competing in the major Gippsland Football League, the Warragul Football Club and another, the Warragul Industrials, competing in the Ellinbank & District Football League.

The Warragul & District Junior Football League caters for younger Australian Rules footballers, with three teams based in Warragul, the Colts, Warranor (at Eastern Park) & the Blues (at Marist-Sion College ). The WDJFL has three competitions, consisting of the under-10s, under-12s and the Under-14½s.

The Warragul Little Athletics Centre meets on Saturdays throughout the summer season at the Geoff Watt Memorial Track, Burke Street, Warragul.  It caters for young athletes in age groups ranging from Under 6 through to Under 17. As well as competing locally, athletes are able to contest Regional and State Championships in Track & Field as well as Relay Championships and Multi-Events.

Warragul's Wild Dog Triathlon Club also meets on Saturdays throughout the summer season for a swim/cycle/run event.  The club caters for all ages and abilities with Junior, Under 14, Fun Tri, Super-Sprint, A Grade and B Grade categories. Weekly competition commences at the clubrooms opposite the indoor pool in Burke Street, Warragul.

Warragul Harness Racing Club conducts regular meetings at its racetrack in the town.

The Warragul Greyhound Racing Club holds regular greyhound racing meetings at the Logan Park Showgrounds. The track opened on 14 September 1956.

Golfers play at the course of the Warragul Country Club on Sutton Street.

Warragul possesses one of the best outdoor velodromes in the state and is serviced by the Warragul Cycling Club (WCC), which runs road races most Saturdays on the outskirts of the town.

The club hosts the Baw Baw Classic road race, held early each April.  This race features one of the hardest climbs in the country and has been won by riders such as 2000 Cyclist of the year, Dave McKenzie, Tour de France Stage Winner, Simon Gerrans and 2009 Australian Road Champion, Peter McDonald.

Local media

Newspapers
Warragul has two weekly local newspapers, The Warragul and Drouin Gazette and a free publication, The West Gippsland Trader. According to the Warragul Regional Newspapers website, The Gazette and The Trader are distributed to locations from as far as Pakenham to Moe and from Poowong to Noojee, covering over 40,000 readers.

Warragul also has a free twice-monthly print and online newspaper, the Warragul & Baw Baw Citizen. The Warragul Citizen was established in 2011 as a quarterly print paper before becoming bi-monthly in 2012, covering Warragul, Drouin and Yarragon. The paper's online news offering started in late 2011 and covers all of Baw Baw. The paper moved to being online-only in 2013, printing the last physical edition of its original run in February. In 2014 the paper announced it would return to print with monthly editions from 11 July, changing the name to Warragul & Baw Baw Citizen in the process.

The West Gippsland Gazette was published from 1898 to 1930 in Warragul; it has been digitised and is available on Trove.

Radio
Warragul has two commercial radio stations, 531 3GG and 94.3 Triple M Gippsland. 3GG commenced in 1937, then known as 3UL. It changed its name to 3GG in 1989. Triple M Gippsland commenced broadcasting in 2002. Initially known as Sea FM and later Star FM and Hit FM.

Warragul also receives the Drouin-based West Gippsland Community Radio, 103.1 3BBR FM.

The radio reception available in Warragul includes many of the Melbourne commercial stations (such as 105.1 Triple M, Smooth 91.5, 3AW 693, Nova 100), ABC Broadcasters (774 ABC Melbourne, 96.7 Triple J and 100.7 ABC Gippsland) and Gippsland commercial stations based further east in Traralgon (99.5 TRFM and Gold 1242).

Military history
During World War II, Warragul was the location of RAAF No.2 Inland Aircraft Fuel Depot (IAFD), completed in 1942 and closed on 14 June 1944. Usually consisting of four tanks, 31 fuel depots were built across Australia for the storage and supply of aircraft fuel for the Royal Australian Air Force and the United States Army Air Forces at a total cost of £900,000 ($1,800,000).

Notable people

 Gary Ayres – Former coach of the Adelaide Crows Football Club and former Hawthorn premiership player
 Robert Baldry – Former Victoria cricket team cricket player
 Jason Bargwanna – V8 Supercar driver and 2000 Bathurst 1000 winner
 William Kinsey Bolton CBE VD (1860–1941) – Soldier
 Travis Demsey – Former drummer of The Living End
  Andrew Dent AM – Doctor and humanitarian worker
 Smacka Fitzgibbon – Jazz musician
 Graeme Gahan – Former Richmond footballer
 Chris Godsil – Professor of Mathematics at the University of Waterloo, Ontario, Canada
 Edward 'Carjie' Greeves – First Brownlow Medallist and Geelong footballer
 John Guy – Leading British historian and biographer
 Trent Hotton – Former Collingwood and Carlton AFL footballer
 Craig Hutchison – TV personality on the Nine Network and Triple M radio personality
 Margaret Jackson, AC – Australian corporate executive (former Chairman of QANTAS)
 Walter Langcake – woodcarver and sculptor
 Robert Murphy – Former player & captain of the Western Bulldogs in the AFL
 Alan Noonan – Former VFL footballer for the Essendon Football Club and the Richmond Football Club
 Andrew T. O'Connor – Australian novelist
 Luke O'Dea – Soccer player with Melbourne Victory in the Hyundai A-League
 Mark Ridgway – Former Tasmanian Tigers cricket player
 Lionel Rose – Former bantamweight world boxing champion (honoured by life-size bronze statue in Queen Street Park) 
 Barry Round – Footscray (Western Bulldogs) and Sydney Swans Brownlow Medallist
 Jayden Warn – Wheelchair rugby gold medallist at the 2016 Rio Paralympics
 Geoff Watt – Former long-distance runner and namesake of the local athletics track
 Kathy Watt – Australia's first cycling gold medallist at the 1992 Barcelona Summer Olympics in the women's road race.  She also won a silver medal in the 3000m individual pursuit event at these Olympic games

References

External links

Baw Baw Shire
Warragul Climate Statistics

Towns in Victoria (Australia)
Shire of Baw Baw